Simon Mander (born 31 January 1964) is a New Zealand sailor. He competed in the men's 470 event at the 1988 Summer Olympics.

References

External links
 

1964 births
Living people
New Zealand male sailors (sport)
Olympic sailors of New Zealand
Sailors at the 1988 Summer Olympics – 470
Sportspeople from Christchurch